The  Brisingids are deep-sea-dwelling starfish in the order Brisingida.

Description
These starfish have between 6 to 18 long, attenuated arms which they use for suspension feeding. Other characteristics include a single series of marginals, a fused ring of disc plates, the lack of actinal plates, a spool-like ambulacral column, reduced abactinal plates, and crossed pedicellariae. They are 40 times the size of disk radius and have 7-20 flexible spiny arms.

Distribution
Brisingida occur in a number of deep-sea locations, particularly in the Caribbean and New Zealand.
 This type of species are found of varying size especially in the eastern Pacific Ocean at a depth of 1,820–2,418 m.

Taxonomy
The Brisingida contain two families, with 18 genera:

Family Brisingidae, G.O. Sars, 1875
Genus Astrolirus, Fisher, 1917 — (two species)
Genus Astrostephane, Fisher, 1917 — (two species)
Genus Brisinga Asbjørnsen, 1856 (synonym: Craterobrisinga, Fisher, 1916) — (20 species)
Genus Brisingaster Loriol, 1883 — (monotypic)
Genus Brisingella Fisher, 1917 — (monotypic)
Genus Brisingenes Fisher, 1917 — (four species)
Genus Hymenodiscus Perrier, 1884 — (16 species)
Genus Midgardia Downey, 1972 — (monotypic)
Genus Novodinia Dartnall, Pawson, Pope & B.J. Smith, 1969 (synonym: Odinia, Perrier, 1885) — (13 species)
Genus Odinella Fisher, 1940 — (monotypic)
Genus Stegnobrisinga Fisher, 1916 — (three species)
Family Freyellidae, Downey, 1986
Genus Astrocles Fisher, 1917 — (three species)
Genus Belgicella Ludwig, 1903 — (monotypic)
Genus Colpaster Sladen, 1889 — (two species)
Genus Freyastera Downey, 1986 — (six species)
Genus Freyella Perrier, 1885 (synonym: Freyellidea, Fisher, 1917) — (31 species)
Genus Freyellaster Fisher 1918 — (five species)

References

Further reading
Hansson, H.G. (2001). Echinodermata, in: Costello, M.J. et al. (Ed.) (2001). European register of marine species: a check-list of the marine species in Europe and a bibliography of guides to their identification. Collection Patrimoines Naturels, 50: pp. 336–351 (look up in IMIS) [details]
Clark, A.M. and M.E. Downey. (1992). Starfishes of the Atlantic. Chapman & Hall Identification Guides, 3. Chapman & Hall: London, UK. . xxvi, 794 pp. (look up in IMIS) [details]
Downey. M.E. (1986). Revision of the Atlantic Brisingida (Echinodermata: Asteroidea), with description of a new genus and family. Smithsonian Contributions to Zoology No.435. 57pp. [details]
Fisher, W.K. (1917). New genera and species of Brisingidae. Annals and Magazine of Natural History 20(8): 418-431. [details]
Sladen, W.P. (1889). Report on the Asteroidea. Report on the Scientific Results of the Voyage of H.M.S. Challenger during the years 1873-1876, Zoology 30(51): xlii + 893 pages 118 plates. [details]
Clark, A.M.and Mah, C. (2001). An index of names of recent Asteroidea, part 4. Forcipulatida and Brisingida, in: Jangoux, M.; Lawrence, J.M. (Ed.) (2001). Echinoderm Studies, 6: pp. 229–347 (look up in IMIS) [details]